Lynn Baggett (born Ruth Baggett; May 10, 1923 – March 22, 1960) also credited as Lynne Baggett, was an American actress.

Early life 
Lynn Baggett was born Ruth Baggett in Wichita Falls, Texas on May 10, 1923 to David L. Baggett, who worked in the oil industry and Ruth Baggett (née Simmons), who worked as a stenographer. Following her high school graduation in Dallas, she was discovered at a department store by a Warner Bros. agent and signed with the studio despite not having any experience in acting. The studio promoted her as a beauty queen, giving her minor roles as singers, party girls, waitresses and nurses. 

Years later however, Baggett was still receiving non-major roles and was eventually released from her contract in 1946. She signed with Universal shortly after, and immediately got a her first major role in The Time of Their Lives (1946). The recruits of Camp Haan described her as adorable, amicable and amorous, leading her getting coined "the Triple A girl".

Acting career 
She appeared in a bit part in her first film, 1941's Manpower, starring Edward G. Robinson, George Raft and Marlene Dietrich. Baggett spent the next several years in a number of uncredited roles including a chorus girl in Murder on the Waterfront (1943) and the oldest daughter of the title character in The Adventures of Mark Twain (1944), and in her first film noir feature, Mildred Pierce (1945), she’s the dark-haired waitress who gets into an argument in an early scene about stealing tips. Her biggest role was as the wife of the murdered Mr Phillips in DOA (1950). She however, only appears in two short scenes. 

Baggett was criticised for being difficult to work with and lacking intelligence. Arthur Laurents, playwright, said of her: "She was very sweet, and very dumb". One producer's wife described her as being "foolish, with no brains at all." She got in trouble with her studio due to her alcoholism and cocaine use. Despite her acting ability, she was also condemned for her lack of screen charisma or presence.

Personal life 

Baggett married Polish-born movie producer Sam Spiegel (21 years older than Baggett) in 1948. Spiegel and Baggett were in an unhappy marriage full of fierceness and dishonesty. In November 1953, Baggett went to court asking for $3,685 per month in temporary alimony, claiming that Spiegel had abandoned her two years earlier. 2 months later, Spiegel was ordered to pay her $500 in monthly payments. 

Spiegel later alleged that Baggett had destroyed his property, including damaging most of his artwork collection and his suits. Baggett was in an affair with Irwin Shaw and John Huston, while Spiegel was busy working on The African Queen (1951).

They divorced 7 years later in 1955, 3 months after Baggett's release from prison.

1954 hit and run 
During the evening of July 7, 1954, Baggett was driving a station wagon which she had borrowed from an acquaintance from Warner Bros., when she crashed into the rear of another car near Waring and Orlando Avenues in Los Angeles. The car she hit was filled with young boys returning from a day trip to a campsite. The force of the crash killed nine year-old Joel Watnick who died of his injuries when he hit the pavement. Another boy, five year-old Anthony Fell, was also seriously injured. 

After briefly examining the scene, Baggett claimed she "blacked out" in fear, before leaving the scene. Baggett drove several miles before reaching a movie theatre where she calmed herself. Police searched for her car for the next 2 days, before discovering it in a San Francisco repair shop and immediately arrested her once she came to collect the car. She was later charged with manslaughter, leaving a scene of an accident, and was convicted of felony hit-and-run. In December of that year she was sentenced to 60 days in county jail and placed on three years' probation.

Death 
Baggett had a history of severe depression, substance abuse and mental problems. She attempted suicide from sleeping pills in June 1959, but called the telephone operator for help moments before passing out and was saved by police who had to enter by removing the hinges from the back door. Later that year, it was found she was suffering from paralysis due to drug addiction and diagnosed as a "chronic depressed neurotic". There were reports an early childhood head injury may have caused Baggett's adult mental issues, however it remains unclear. She was deeply affected by the death of her mother (whom she was very close to) in 1957.

Two months after aborting suicide, she claimed her foldaway bed had collapsed on top of her, trapping her underneath for six days. Baggett arrived at the hospital, dehydrated, malnourished and was paralyzed from the knees down. Many did not believe her story, and assumed her story was made up following Baggett's friend contradicting with Baggett's story stating she was fine a few days before.

On 23 March 1960, she was found dead in her apartment with the cause of death being a barbiturate overdose. It was ruled a suicide, however close friends of Baggett believed it was an accidental overdose as she sent a happy note to them not long before saying she was on the path to recovery and was being taken care of.

Spiegel paid for her funeral, despite not attending.

Filmography

References 

1923 births
1960 deaths
Actresses from Texas
20th-century American actresses
Drug-related suicides in California
Barbiturates-related deaths